China Railway Bo Sea 3 (中铁渤海3号) is a military/civilian dual use roll-on/roll-off ship built in the People’s Republic of China (PRC) for the People's Liberation Army Navy (PLAN).Built by Tianjin New Port Shipbuilding Heavy Industries, this ship first entered civilian service in 2008.

This ship is powered electrically by azimuth thrusters, able to reach 18.8 kt top speed. The ship is designed to carry 650 passengers, 120 vehicles, and 50 railway carriages. Deployed as a roll-on/roll-off passenger (ROPAX) during peace time, the ship would be activated in national emergency to be used as a military ro-ro ship, a task the ship has successfully completed in several military exercises such as the one conducted in August 16 – 17, 2016.Specification:
Length: 182.6 meter
Beam: 24.8 meter
Draft: 5.2 meter
Tonnage: 25000 gross ton
Speed: 18.8 kt

Reference

Auxiliary ships of the People's Liberation Army Navy